Lindbergia is a genus of gastropods belonging to the family Pristilomatidae.

The species of this genus are found in Mediterranean.

Species:

Lindbergia beroni 
Lindbergia gittenbergeri 
Lindbergia karainensis 
Lindbergia orbicularis 
Lindbergia pageti 
Lindbergia parnonensis 
Lindbergia pinteri 
Lindbergia pseudoillyrica 
Lindbergia spiliaenymphis 
Lindbergia stylokamarae

References

Pristilomatidae